Estragole (p-allylanisole, methyl chavicol) is a phenylpropene, a natural organic compound. Its chemical structure consists of a benzene ring substituted with a methoxy group and an allyl group.  It is an isomer of anethole, differing with respect to the location of the double bond.  It is a colorless liquid, although impure samples can appear yellow.  It is a component of various trees and plants, including turpentine (pine oil), anise, fennel, bay, tarragon, and basil. It is used in the preparation of fragrances.

The compound is named for estragon, the French name of tarragon.

Production
Hundreds of tonnes of basil oil are produced annually by steam distillation of Ocimum basilicum (common basil).  This oil is mainly estragole but also contains substantial amounts of linalool.
Estragole is the primary constituent of essential oil of tarragon (comprising 60–75%). It is also present in pine oil, turpentine, fennel, anise (2%), Clausena anisata and Syzygium anisatum.

Estragole is used in perfumes and is restricted in flavours as a biologically active principle: it can only be present in a flavour by using an essential oil. Upon treatment with potassium hydroxide, estragole converts to anethole. A known use of estragole is in the synthesis of magnolol.

Safety
Estragole is suspected to be carcinogenic and genotoxic, as is indicated by a report of the European Union Committee on Herbal Medicinal Products. Several studies have clearly established that the profiles of metabolism, metabolic activation, and covalent binding are dose dependent and that the relative importance diminishes markedly at low levels of exposure (that is, these events are not linear with respect to dose). In particular, rodent studies show that these events are minimal probably in the dose range of 1–10 mg/kg body weight, which is approximately 100 to 1,000 times the anticipated human exposure to this substance. For these reasons it is concluded that the present exposure to estragole resulting from consumption of herbal medicinal products (short time use in adults at recommended posology) does not pose a significant cancer risk. In the meantime exposure of estragole to sensitive groups such as young children, pregnant and breastfeeding women should be minimized. 

The Scientific Committee on Food from the Health and Consumer Protection Directorate took a more concerned position and concluded that "Estragole has been demonstrated to be genotoxic and carcinogenic. Therefore the existence of a threshold cannot be assumed and the Committee could not establish a safe exposure limit. Consequently, reductions in exposure and restrictions in use levels are indicated."

See also 
 Anethole, an isomer
 Chavicol, the phenol analog
 Safrole, a methylenedioxy analog

References

External links
 Opinion by the Scientific Committee on Food of the European Union on Estragole

Food additives
Perfume ingredients
Phenylpropenes
Phenol ethers
Allyl compounds
O-methylated natural phenols